was a Japanese music and video game publisher.

History
NEC Avenue was founded in 1987 as a record label within NEC. NEC Avenue eventually got involved with video games, and secured licenses to produce console versions of arcade titles from Sega and Taito. Toshio Tabeta, the employee responsible for the Sega deal, would later learn that the Sega employee that gave NEC Avenue permission to make arcade ports was scolded. Video game records represented about 10% of NEC Avenue's business in 1994. In October 1995, its game division was spun-off into a new NEC subsidiary named NEC Interchannel. NEC Interchannel took over NEC Avenue's music and game operations in October 1997, then acquired its music subsidiary, in March 1998. NEC Avenue was dissolved on January 29, 1999, and NEC Avenue Music Publishing became IC Avenue Music Publishing after Interchannel split from NEC in 2004.

Artists
DOME
Joe Hisaishi
Junko Yagami
Katsuhiko Nakagawa
Monday Michiru
Nobukazu Takemura
Shinji Harada
Takako Ōta

Video games
Space Harrier (1988)
Fantasy Zone (1988)
SonSon II (1989)
Hyper Dyne Side Arms (1989)
F-1 Dream (1989)
Jūōki (1989)
Side Arms Special (1989)
Darius Alpha (1990)
Super Darius (1990)
Dai Makaimura (1990)
Operation Wolf (1990)
After Burner II (1990)
Thunder Blade (1990)
Daisenpū (1990)
Out Run (1990)
Hellfire S (1991)
Splash Lake (1991)
Daisenpū Custom (1991)
Might & Magic (1992)
Bonanza Bros. (1992)
Forgotten Worlds (1992)
Dragon Knight II (1992)
Gain Ground SX (1992)
Horror Story (1993)
Rainbow Islands (1993)
Super Darius II (1993)
Puyo Puyo CD (1994)
Tenchi wo Kurau (1994)
Chiki Chiki Boys (1994)
Dragon Knight III (1994)
Strider Hiryū (1994)
Dragon Knight & Graffiti (1995)
Tenchi Muyō! Ryōōki (1995)
Space Invaders: The Original Game (1995)
Asuka 120% Maxima (1995)
Dōkyūsei (1995)
Dōkyūsei 2 (1996)
Madō Monogatari: Honō no Sotsuenji (1996)
Dragon Knight 4 (1997)

References

Video game companies established in 1987
Video game companies disestablished in 1999
Defunct video game companies of Japan
Japanese companies established in 1987
Japanese companies disestablished in 1999
Former NEC subsidiaries